Leduc was a provincial electoral district in Alberta, Canada, mandated to return a single member to the Legislative Assembly of Alberta from 1905 to 1971 and again from 1993 to 2004.

History
Leduc was one of the original 25 electoral districts contested in the 1905 Alberta general election upon Alberta joining Confederation in September 1905. The electoral district was named for the City of Leduc in central Alberta.

Leduc was dissolved in the 1971 electoral district re-distribution to form the Wetaskiwin-Leduc and Drayton Valley electoral districts. Leduc would be recreated in the 1993 electoral district re-distribution from Wetaskiwin-Leduc and Camrose electoral districts.

Leduc would once again be dissolved in the 2003 electoral boundary re-distribution and become Leduc-Beaumont-Devon.

Members of the Legislative Assembly (MLAs)

Ronald E. Ansley despite becoming increasingly unhappy with the Social Credit government over implementation of Douglas monetary reforms ran for re-election in the 1948 Alberta general election. He was returned to office for his fourth term easily defeating the two other candidates.

Shortly after the election the Social Credit voted to exclude Albert Bourcier from the Social Credit caucus and expelled some other Douglasite Social Creditors from the party through a motion passed at the 1948 Social Credit Annual General Meeting. Ansley who was a member of the group was not expelled and openly opposed the expulsions.

The Social Credit League formally asked the government in 1949 to expel all members of caucus including Ansley who held membership in the Douglas Social Credit Council.

In 1951 he openly led a revolt that defeated the Mineral Taxation Act 29 to 15 in a recorded division on third reading. He was expelled from caucus on June 16, 1952 after attending a nomination convention asking Bourcier to run as an Independent Social Credit candidate.

The Leduc Social Credit Constituency Association nominated Ansley as their candidate with a clause in the motion to endorse stating that he would be supported regardless of what banner he runs under. After being unable to run as a straight Social Credit candidate, Ansley stood for re-election as an Independent Social Credit candidate. He won a hotly contested race on the second ballot defeating two other candidates to return to his fifth term in office.

Ansley ran for a sixth term in office in the 1955 Alberta general election. The race five way race was very closely contested. Ansely ended up holding on to his seat by winning in the fourth vote count.

Ansley ran for a seventh term in the 1959 Alberta general election. He held his seat easily defeating two other candidates as no official Social Credit candidate ran against him.

Ansley ran for an eighth term in office in the 1963 Alberta general election. He was defeated by Social Credit candidate James Douglas Henderson finishing a distant third place in a field of six candidates.

Election results

1905 general election

1909 general election

1913 general election

1917 general election

1921 general election

1926 general election

1930 general election

1935 general election

1940 general election

1944 general election

1948 general election

1952 general election

1955 general election

1959 general election

1963 general election

1967 general election

1993 general election

1997 general election

2001 general election

Plebiscite results

1957 liquor plebiscite

On October 30, 1957 a stand alone plebiscite was held province wide in all 50 of the then current provincial electoral districts in Alberta. The government decided to consult Alberta voters to decide on liquor sales and mixed drinking after a divisive debate in the Legislature. The plebiscite was intended to deal with the growing demand for reforming antiquated liquor control laws.

The plebiscite was conducted in two parts. Question A asked in all districts, asked the voters if the sale of liquor should be expanded in Alberta, while Question B asked in a handful of districts within the corporate limits of Calgary and Edmonton asked if men and woman were allowed to drink together in establishments.

Province wide Question A of the plebiscite passed in 33 of the 50 districts while Question B passed in all five districts. Leduc voted in favour of the proposal by a near landslide majority. Voter turnout in the district was abysmal, falling well under the province wide average of 46%.

Official district returns were released to the public on December 31, 1957. The Social Credit government in power at the time did not considered the results binding. However the results of the vote led the government to repeal all existing liquor legislation and introduce an entirely new Liquor Act.

Municipal districts lying inside electoral districts that voted against the Plebiscite were designated Local Option Zones by the Alberta Liquor Control Board and considered effective dry zones, business owners that wanted a license had to petition for a binding municipal plebiscite in order to be granted a license.

See also
List of Alberta provincial electoral districts
Leduc, Alberta, a city in central Alberta

References

Further reading

External links
Elections Alberta
The Legislative Assembly of Alberta

1905 establishments in Alberta
Former provincial electoral districts of Alberta